AT-6 may refer to:

 AT-6 Spiral, the NATO reporting name for an anti-tank missile system of the Soviet Union
 T-6 Texan, a WW2-era training aircraft used by numerous air forces
 AT-6B Wolverine, Armed version of the Beechcraft T-6 Texan II training aircraft for primary weapons training or light attack roles